Kidappadam is a 1955 Indian Malayalam-language film, directed by M. R. S. Mani and produced by M. Kunchacko. The film stars Prem Nazir and Kumari Thankam. The film had musical score by V. Dakshinamoorthy. The popular song "Kunkuma Chaaraninju" is from this movie.

Cast
 Prem Nazir
 Miss Kumari
 Thikkurissy Sukumaran Nair
 Muthukulam Raghavan Pilla
 Boban Kunchacko
 Adoor Pankajam
 Kalaikkal Kumaran

References

External links
 

1955 films
1950s Malayalam-language films